The Memorial to Pioneer Odd Fellows is a California Historical Landmark located in Alpine County, California, near Carson Pass. A group of gold seeking Odd Fellows, in 1849, painted their names and the symbol of the Independent Order of Odd Fellows on a group of granite boulders. In May 1941, a marker was placed at the site reading:

Pioneers of CaliforniaPioneers of the Brotherhood of ManWe Salute You. Your bodies have blended with the dust of the West. Your spirit lives and inspires.Dedicated to their memory, by the Grand Lodge of California Independent Order of Odd Fellows,May 1941

References

California Historical Landmarks
Independent Order of Odd Fellows
1849 in California
History of Alpine County, California